Hambly is a surname. Notable people with the surname include:

Barbara Hambly (born 1951), American novelist and screenwriter of fantasy, science fiction, mystery, and historical fiction
Barbara Hambly (field hockey) (born 1958), former English field hockey player, captained the British squad at the 1988 Summer Olympics
Brian Hambly (1938–2008), Australian rugby league player, a representative forward for the Australia national team 1959–1965
Charles Wesley Hambly (born 1863), drover and political figure in Ontario
Edmund Hambly (1942–1995), British structural engineer
Gary Hambly (born 1956), Australian former professional rugby league footballer
Kevin Hambly (born 1973), American volleyball coach at the University of Illinois at Urbana-Champaign
Thomas Hambly Ross (1886–1956), Canadian politician
Tim Hambly (born 1983), American professional ice hockey defenceman

See also
Hambly Arena, ice hockey arena in Oshawa, Ontario, Canada
Hamble (disambiguation)
Hamblen
Hambley (surname)
Hamblin (disambiguation)